Soft Samba is a 1964 album by jazz arranger and vibraphonist Gary McFarland. A follow up album, Soft Samba Strings, was released in 1966.

Reception
The initial Billboard magazine review from February 20, 1965 wrote that even though "A pair of stretch socks, two ounces of sherry, and a "Soft Samba" cocktail recipe" were being used to promote the album, it would "curry favor with the public without the promotion incentives" and "The artist's humming helps too".
Boys' Life magazine wrote that "You'd think that the artists in this album couldn't talk because all you hear is "Ba-ba, baya-baya, byu-byu" and so on with little relief. The results are unique (as you'd expect) but pleasing...We found the wedding of the soft samba to rock 'n' roll a joyous union thanks to the musical ministry of Mr. McFarland".

Track listing
 "Ringo, Won't You Marry Me" (Linda Laurie, Jerry Mack) – 1:46
 "From Russia with Love" (Lionel Bart) – 2:34
 "She Loves You" (John Lennon, Paul McCartney) – 2:16
 "A Hard Day's Night" (Lennon, McCartney) – 3:04
 "The Good Life" (Sacha Distel, Jack Reardon) – 2:05
 "More (Theme from Mondo Cane)" (Riz Ortolani, Nino Oliviero, Marcello Ciorciolini, Norman Newell) – 2:18
 "And I Love Her" (Lennon, McCartney) – 3:55
 "The Love Goddess" (Percy Faith, Mack David) – 1:57
 "I Want to Hold Your Hand" (Lennon, McCartney) – 3:13
 "Emily" (Johnny Mandel, Johnny Mercer) – 1:51
 "California, Here I Come" (Buddy DeSylva, Al Jolson, Joseph Meyer) – 1:52
 "La Vie en Rose" (Louiguy, Édith Piaf, David) – 2:06

Personnel
Gary McFarland - arranger, vibraphone
Jimmy Cleveland - trombone
Seldon Powell, Spencer Sinatra - flute
Patty Bowen - piano
Antônio Carlos Jobim, Kenny Burrell - guitar
Richard Davis - double bass
Arnie Wise, Sol Gubin, Willie Bobo - percussion

Production
Creed Taylor - producer
Michael J. Malatak - cover design
Lester Bookbinder - cover photo
Wally King - liner notes
Rudy Van Gelder - engineer
Val Valentin - director of engineering

References

 

1964 albums
Albums arranged by Gary McFarland
Albums produced by Creed Taylor
Albums recorded at Van Gelder Studio
Bossa nova albums
Gary McFarland albums
Instrumental albums
Verve Records albums